Pristavica is a small settlement in the Municipality of Šentjernej in southeastern Slovenia. It lies on a slight elevation above the right bank of the Krka River southwest of Gorenja Gomila. The entire municipality is part of the traditional region of Lower Carniola. It is now included in the Southeast Slovenia Statistical Region.

References

External links
Pristavica pri Šentjerneju on Geopedia

Populated places in the Municipality of Šentjernej